Peter J. Larkin (born December 23, 1953 in Pittsfield, Massachusetts) is an American politician who represented the 3rd Berkshire District in the Massachusetts House of Representatives from 1991 to 2005.

References

1953 births
Democratic Party members of the Massachusetts House of Representatives
Politicians from Pittsfield, Massachusetts
St. Bonaventure University alumni
Living people